The 2021–22 Louisiana Ragin' Cajuns women's basketball team represented the University of Louisiana at Lafayette during the 2021–22 NCAA Division I women's basketball season. The Ragin' Cajuns, led by tenth-year head coach Garry Brodhead, played all home games at the Cajundome along with the Louisiana Ragin' Cajuns men's basketball team. They were members of the Sun Belt Conference.

Previous season 
The Ragin' Cajuns finished the 2020–21 season 16–8, 13–1 in Sun Belt play to finish as Western Divisional champions for the first time in program history. They made it to the 2020-21 Sun Belt Conference women's basketball tournament where the ultimately lost to Eastern Divisional champion Troy in the championship.  As conference regular season champion, the Cajuns were one of nine automatic bids to the 2021 WNIT. They finished 0–2 in the tournament, where they were defeated by eventual Quarterfinalist Colorado in the first round and OVC regular season champs UT Martin in the consolation round.

Offseason

Departures

Transfers

Recruiting

Roster

Schedule and results

|-
!colspan=9 style=| Exhibition
|-

|-
!colspan=9 style=| Non-conference Regular Season

|-
!colspan=9 style=| Conference Regular season

|-
!colspan=9 style=| Sun Belt Tournament

See also
 2021–22 Louisiana Ragin' Cajuns men's basketball team

References

Louisiana Ragin' Cajuns women's basketball seasons
Louisiana Ragin' Cajuns
Louisiana Ragin' Cajuns women's basketball
Louisiana Ragin' Cajuns women's basketball